Kostadin Markov (born 18 February 1979) is a Bulgarian footballer. Mainly a right back, he can also play as a midfielder and winger.

On 7 October 2016, Markov left his last team Levski Karlovo.

References

1979 births
Living people
Bulgarian footballers
First Professional Football League (Bulgaria) players
OFC Pirin Blagoevgrad players
PFC Spartak Pleven players
FC Lokomotiv 1929 Sofia players
PFC Pirin Blagoevgrad players
PFC Lokomotiv Mezdra players
PFC Minyor Pernik players
PFC Lokomotiv Plovdiv players
FC Septemvri Simitli players
FC Levski Karlovo players

Association football midfielders
Sportspeople from Blagoevgrad